The Essanay Film Manufacturing Company was an early American motion picture studio. The studio was founded in 1907 in Chicago, and later developed an additional film lot in Niles Canyon, California. Its various stars included Francis X. Bushman, Gloria Swanson and studio co-owner, actor and director, Broncho Billy Anderson. It is probably best known today for its series of Charlie Chaplin comedies from 1915-1916.  In the late 1916 it merged with other studios and stopped issuing films in the fall of 1918.  According to film historian Steve Massa, Essanay is one of the important early studios, with comedies as a particular strength.

Founding

The studio was founded in 1907 in Chicago by George K. Spoor and Gilbert M. Anderson, originally as the Peerless Film Manufacturing Company. On August 10, 1907, playing on the founders' initials the name was changed to Essanay ("S and A").

Essanay was originally located at 501 Wells Street (modern numbering: 1360 N. Wells). Essanay's first film, An Awful Skate, or The Hobo on Rollers (July 1907), starring Ben Turpin (then the studio janitor), produced for only a couple hundred dollars, grossed several thousand dollars in release. The studio prospered and in 1908 moved to its more famous address at 1333–45 W. Argyle Street in Uptown, Chicago.

Leading players and staff
Essanay produced silent films with such stars (and stars of the future) as George Periolat, Ben Turpin, Wallace Beery, Thomas Meighan, Colleen Moore, Francis X. Bushman, Gloria Swanson, Ann Little, Helen Dunbar, Lester Cuneo, Florence Oberle, Lewis Stone, Virginia Valli, Edward Arnold, Edmund Cobb and Rod La Rocque. The mainstay of the organization, however, were studio co-owner, Anderson, starring in the very popular "Broncho Billy" westerns, and Charlie Chaplin, who was for a time its biggest star.

Allan Dwan was hired by Essanay Studios as a screenwriter and developed into a famous Hollywood director. Louella Parsons was also hired as a screenwriter and went on to be a famous Hollywood gossip columnist. Owners Spoor (in 1948) and Anderson (in 1958) received the Oscars' Academy Honorary Award, for their pioneering efforts with Essanay.

Productions
Essanay's productions include the first American film version of A Christmas Carol (1908) as well as the Western short The James Boys of Missouri (1908), which is notable for being the first biopic about the nineteenth-century American outlaw brothers Jesse and Frank James. The studio in 1916 also released the first American Sherlock Holmes film. Directed by Arthur Berthelet, it stars William Gillette in the title role. The first pie-in-the-face gag on screen is believed to have hit Essanay star Ben Turpin in Mr. Flip (1909). Animated comedies were produced as well by the Chicago company, including installments showcasing the small boy "Dreamy Dud" and his dog "Wag", who in the early 1900s were among the favorite cartoon characters of theater audiences.

Due to Chicago's seasonal weather patterns and the popularity of westerns, Gilbert Anderson took a part of the company west, first to Colorado. He told The Denver Post in 1909, "Colorado is the finest place in the country for Wild West stuff". The western operations moved to California, but traveled between Northern to Southern California seasonally. This included locations in San Rafael, just outside San Francisco, and Santa Barbara.  Essanay opened the Essanay-West studio in Niles, California, in 1912, at the foot of Niles Canyon, where many Broncho Billy westerns were shot, along with The Tramp featuring Charlie Chaplin. The Chicago studio, as well as the new Niles studio, continued to produce films for another five years, reaching a total of well over 1,400 Essanay titles during its ten-year history.

Chaplin Films

In late 1914, Essanay succeeded in contracting Charlie Chaplin away from Mack Sennett's Keystone Studios, offering Chaplin a higher production salary and his own production unit. Chaplin made fourteen short comedies for Essanay in 1915-1916, at both the Chicago and Niles studios, plus a cameo appearance in Broncho Billy film 'His Regeneration'. Chaplin's Essanays are more disciplined than the chaotic roughhouse of Chaplin's Keystones, with better story value and character development. The landmark film of the Chaplin series is The Tramp (1915), in which Chaplin's vagabond character finds work on a farm and is smitten with the farmer's daughter. Chaplin injected moments of drama and pathos unheard of in slapstick comedies (the tramp is felled by a gunshot wound, and then disappointed in romance). The film ends with the famous shot of the lonely tramp with his back to the camera, walking down the road dejectedly, and then squaring his shoulders optimistically and heading for his next adventure. Audiences responded to the humanity of Chaplin's character, and Chaplin continued to explore serious or sentimental themes within comic situations.

Attempting to capitalize on the popularity of Chaplin, the studio in 1915 had its cartoon character Dreamy Dud in a Chaplin themed short Dreamy Dud Sees Charlie Chaplin in which Dud watches a Chaplin short.

Chaplin's stock company at Essanay included Ben Turpin, who disliked working with the meticulous Chaplin and appeared with him in only a couple of films; ingenue Edna Purviance, who became his off-screen sweetheart as well; Leo White, almost always playing a fussy continental villain; and all-purpose authority figures Bud Jamison and John Rand.

Chaplin disliked the unpredictable weather of Chicago and left after only one year for more money and more creative control elsewhere. His departure caused a rift between founders Spoor and Anderson. Chaplin was the studio's biggest moneymaker, and Essanay resorted to creating "new" Chaplin comedies from file footage and out-takes. Finally, with Chaplin off the Essanay scene for good, Essanay signed French comedian Max Linder, whose clever pantomime, often compared to Chaplin's, failed to match Chaplin's popularity in America.

V-L-S-E, Incorporated
In 1915, the Essanay entered into an agreement, in a last-ditch effort to save the studio, with Vitagraph Studios, Lubin Manufacturing Company, and Selig Polyscope Company to form a film distribution partnership known as V-L-S-E, Incorporated. It was orchestrated by Chicago distributor George Kleine. Only the Vitagraph brand name continued into the 1920s, and was absorbed by Warner Bros. in 1925.

Black Cat films 
In 1916, Essanay arranged a deal with William Kane, who later become the publisher and editor of The Black Cat, to acquire a hundred stories from the magazine to turn into "Black Cat" films, each about half-an-hour long.<ref name=":11">{{Cite magazine |last=Anonymous |date=July 28, 1917 |title=Odd Suit by Editor'''s Editor |url=https://books.google.com/books?id=RL5NAQAAMAAJ&dq=essanay+%22black+cat%22&pg=RA6-PA31 |magazine=The Editor and Publisher |volume= |issue= |page=31 |access-date=November 20, 2022 |ref=none}}</ref>  The plan was to release one picture a week, starting on December 5, 1916 with "The Egg", a comedy starring Richard Travers and Marguerite Clayton.  Kane loaned Essanay a set of The Black Cat issues, complete from the first issue through May 1915, and received $1,250 from Essanay for the one hundred stories they selected.  Essanay failed to return the magazines to Kane, who sued them for $20,000 compensation for the loss of the magazines, eventually winning his case in the US Supreme Court.

Final years
George K. Spoor continued to work in the motion picture industry, introducing an unsuccessful 3-D system in 1923, and Spoor-Berggren Natural Vision, a 65 mm widescreen format, in 1930. He died in Chicago in 1953. G. M. Anderson became an independent producer, sponsoring Stan Laurel in a series of silent comedies. Anderson died in Los Angeles in 1971.

The Essanay building in Chicago was later taken over by independent producer Norman Wilding, who made industrial films. Wilding's tenancy was much longer than Essanay's. In the early 1970s, a portion of the studio was offered to Columbia College (Chicago) for a dollar but the offer lapsed without action. Then it was given to a non-profit television corporation which sold it. One tenant was the midwest office of Technicolor. Today the Essanay lot is the home of St. Augustine's College, and its main meeting hall has been named the Charlie Chaplin Auditorium.

See also
 Chicago film industry
 Niles Essanay Silent Film Museum

 References 

Further reading
 David Kiehn, Broncho Billy and the Essanay Film Company'', Farwell Books, 2003. .

External links 
 Essanaystudios.org: Official Essanay Studios landmarks website
 Nilesfilmmuseum.org: Niles−Essanay Silent Film Museum—at Essanay Studios West, located in Niles Canyon, East San Francisco Bay Area, California.
 Nilesfilmmuseum.org: "Story of Essanay Studios in Niles"
 History TV: "An animated history of Essanay Studios—detailed history and extensive filmography
 Essanay Film Archive- The Silent Film Channel

 
Mass media companies established in 1907
Mass media companies disestablished in 1918
Silent film studios
Defunct American film studios
Film distributors of the United States
Film production companies of the United States
Buildings and structures in Chicago
Buildings and structures in Fremont, California
Cinema of the San Francisco Bay Area
Cinema of Southern California
Defunct mass media companies of the United States
Defunct companies based in Chicago
Defunct companies based in Greater Los Angeles
Defunct companies based in the San Francisco Bay Area
1907 establishments in Illinois
1913 establishments in California
1918 disestablishments in California
Chicago Landmarks
Landmarks in the San Francisco Bay Area